Victorio Francisco Casa (28 October 1943 – 6 June 2013) was an Argentine professional footballer who played as a forward for San Lorenzo in the Argentine Primera División and in the United States with the Washington Whips and Washington Darts in the first North American Soccer League (NASL). He is the first player in American professional soccer history (and only player in NASL history) to play with one arm; he had lost his right arm in a freak shooting accident before coming to the U.S.

Club career
Casa began his domestic professional career in Buenos Aires, playing with Club Deportivo Norte in his hometown of Mar del Plata. He moved to San Lorenzo in 1962. He signed with Platense in 1966 and played there through 1967.

In 1968, Casa joined the recently formed North American Soccer League, signing with the Washington Whips franchise in Washington, D.C. Playing as a forward, he got into 31 games and scored 5 goals. When the club folded after a season, he returned to Argentina to play in 1969. After some restructuring, the NASL brought the Washington Darts of the American Soccer League into the league as their new D.C. club for the 1970 season. Casa signed with the Darts that year, and in 17 games scored three goals.

Upon Casa's return to the NASL in 1970, the New York Times referred to him in an article as "[t]he highest paid soccer player in the United States ... [he] makes $15,000 a year, speaks no English and has one arm," the result of a 1965 shooting accident, involving the Argentine Navy, that resulted in the amputation of his right arm above the elbow. The piece described him as "[a] man with bright eyes who combs his thick, dark hair straight back." He weighed 145 pounds and was married with two children. In describing the threat to his career after the loss of his arm, Casa said, "Soccer is not played by the arms and I knew I was going to be back."

He died on 6 June 2013, aged 69, in Mar del Plata.

References

1943 births
2013 deaths
Argentine footballers
Association football forwards
North American Soccer Football League players
American Soccer League (1933–1983) players
Club Atlético Platense footballers
Washington Darts players
Washington Whips players
Association footballers with limb difference
Argentine expatriate footballers
Argentine expatriate sportspeople in the United States
Expatriate soccer players in the United States